Ramón Antonio García Fortunato (born December 9, 1969 in Guanare, Portuguesa State, Venezuela) is a former Major League Baseball right-handed pitcher who played for the Chicago White Sox (1991), Milwaukee Brewers (1996) and Houston Astros (1997).

In a three-season career, García compiled a 17–16 record with 200 strikeouts, five saves, and a 4.84 of earned run average in 95 appearances.

See also
 List of players from Venezuela in Major League Baseball

External links
, or Retrosheet
Pura Pelota (Venezuelan Winter League)

1969 births
Living people
Birmingham Barons players
Chicago White Sox players
Gulf Coast White Sox players
Houston Astros players
Lowell Spinners players
Major League Baseball pitchers
Milwaukee Brewers players
Major League Baseball players from Venezuela
Minor league baseball coaches
Nashville Sounds players
Navegantes del Magallanes players
New Orleans Zephyrs players
Pastora de los Llanos players
People from Guanare
Sarasota White Sox players
Vancouver Canadians players
Venezuelan expatriate baseball players in Canada
Venezuelan expatriate baseball players in the United States